Raymond Remember Mali (born April 9, 1937), better known as Ray Mali, was appointed acting President of the International Cricket Council in 2007, following the unexpected death in office of Percy Sonn. He was born in the Cape Province (now Eastern Cape), Union of South Africa. He had been the President of Cricket South Africa since 2003 (the first black person to hold the position) and remained as ICC president till 2008.

He once was a minister in the bantustan of Ciskei.

References

 Ray Mali appointed acting president of ICC from cricket.co.za
 Ray Mali - profile from Rediff.com

South African cricket administrators
1937 births
Presidents of the International Cricket Council
Living people